Anders Oechsler (born July 10, 1979 in Ringsted, Denmark) is a retired Danish handball player (right back) who lastly played for the Danish league team Team Tvis Holstebro. Previously he played for KIF Kolding in Denmark and GWD Minden in Germany.

Per January 2008 Oechsler has played 30 games for the Danish national team and made 70 goals.

External links 
 Player's info 
 About Oechsler at dr.dk 

1979 births
Living people
People from Ringsted
Danish male handball players
KIF Kolding players
Sportspeople from Region Zealand